The Republic of the Escartons (Italian: Repubblica degli Escartons; French: République des Écartons) was a collection of mountain territories located around Mount Viso in the Briançonnais, with territory between Marseille and Turin. It had lands in what is now the French department of Hautes-Alpes, the province of Turin and province of Cuneo. It was named after its capital. Escartons corresponds to the Occitan name for Briançon and in French 'écarter' means 'to divide', specifically 'to divide taxes into quarters'. 

It consisted of a set of mountain territories in what is now the French department of Hautes-Alpes, the province of Turin and province of Cuneo. It enjoyed fiscal and political privileges from the French and although not very large, it had more than forty thousand inhabitants. Every year the leaders of various countries forming the Republic met in council to elect a consul as its leader.

Guigues VII of Viennois conceded the inhabitants of Briançon a charter of liberty in 1244, which was confirmed as a grand charter on 29 May 1343 by his successor Humbert II of Viennois at Beauvoir-en-Royans - he signed it with 18 representatives of the Alpine valleys. This gave birth to the Escartons republic, made up of five separate valleys – Briançonnais, Oulx, Casteldelfino, Val Chisone, and Queyras. The charter was later confirmed by letters patent from all the kings of France from Charles V of France to Louis XVI of France – after the Treaty of Utrecht, this continued until 4 August 1789 for the parts of the Republic which remained French territory.

External links
http://www.escarton.it/

1343 establishments in Europe
1340s establishments in the Holy Roman Empire
1789 disestablishments in France